Celeste Bissardella (born 17 October 1988) is an Italian ice hockey player. She competed in the women's tournament at the 2006 Winter Olympics.

References

External links
 

1988 births
Living people
Italian women's ice hockey players
Olympic ice hockey players of Italy
Ice hockey players at the 2006 Winter Olympics
Ice hockey people from Bolzano